Francis van Londersele (born 6 July 1953 in Montataire) is a directeur sportif with the Cofidis cycling team.

References

Directeur sportifs
Living people
1953 births
Sportspeople from Oise
21st-century French people